Francisco Pérez Sanchez (born 22 July 1978 in Murcia) is a Spanish professional cross-country mountain biker for Wild Wolf Trek Pro Racing, and a former road bicycle racer for several teams including UCI ProTeam . Pérez is a strong climber.

Doping
In 2004, he was banned for 18 months for EPO use having failed a test during the 2003 Tour de Romandie.

Major results

 2007 Tour de France – 72nd
 Clásica de Almería (2006)
 2006 Giro d'Italia – 28th
 2nd, Stage 14
 2005 Vuelta a España – 52nd
 Tour de Romandie – 2 stages (2003) (Stripped of them for double EPO doping)
 GP MR Cortez-Mitsubishi – 1 stage & Overall (2003)

See also
 List of doping cases in cycling

References

External links 

Cyclingnews.com feature: Francisco Perez: Working on the highway (May 19, 2003)

1978 births
Living people
Spanish male cyclists
Doping cases in cycling
Sportspeople from Murcia
Cyclists from the Region of Murcia
Spanish sportspeople in doping cases